The Women’s 150 metre individual medley at the 2014 IPC Swimming European Championships was held at the Pieter van den Hoogenband Swimming Stadium, in Eindhoven from 4–10 August.

Medalists

See also
List of IPC world records in swimming

References

individual medley 150 m women
2014 in women's swimming